NPO Doc was a documentary television channel in the Netherlands.  It was a digital theme channel, available 24 hours, 7 days a week. Typically programs were in the Dutch language. Yet, depending on the subject of the documentary some programmes were in the original language with Dutch subtitles. On 10 March 2014, Holland Doc 24 changed its name into NPO Doc.

The channel closed on 1 July 2016.

References

External links 

 Official Website NPO Doc

Defunct television channels in the Netherlands
Television channels and stations established in 2004
Television channels and stations disestablished in 2016
2004 establishments in the Netherlands